Michael Edward Davis  is an Australian space lawyer.

He is a former chairperson of the Space Industry Association of Australia, and a member of the International Institute of Space Law.

In 1996, Davis graduated with a Master of Space Studies from the International Space University in France.

As a proponent of establishing a dedicated Australian space agency, Davis is regularly featured in the media.

Davis played a key role in Adelaide's successful bid in hosting the International Astronautical Federation's 2017 congress, chairing the local organising committee.

In recognition to his contribution to the Australian space industry, Davis was appointed as an Officer of the Order of Australia in the 2019 Queen's Birthday Honours.

References 

Year of birth missing (living people)
Living people
21st-century Australian lawyers
Officers of the Order of Australia
International Space University alumni